San Cristobal de la Habana may refer to:
The historic name of Havana
San Cristobal de la Habana (cigar)